Scott's Bottom Nature Area or simply Scott's Bottom is a park located along the Green River in southwestern Wyoming and is maintained by the city of Green River, Wyoming.
It offers several trails for recreation as well as an archery range, shooting range, and a small paintball complex that was new as of 2005, however has since been removed. The new outdoor Archery range was built in 2006 and 2007. Scott's Bottom is named for the surrounding few acres, which is simply a wooded area next to the river. There are several other "bottoms" in the area as well. During the warmer months, residents also enjoy fishing in the Green River. Scott's Bottom is also used by local residents with ATVs and other four wheel drive vehicles. Local wildlife in the park include deer, owls, and many other species of animals native to southwestern Wyoming.

Scott's Bottom also goes by the name FMC Park partially named because of a grant from the FMC corporation, which is one of the area's biggest employers.

In 2005, the aging bridge that crosses the river from the city side (and is the park's primary entrance) was replaced with a more stable and secure bridge.
In 2010, that bridge is being replaced by a concrete bridge being constructed by the Wyoming Department of transportation.
Access to the park begins in Green River on East Teton Blvd. From the west, the park can be accessed via a back road that begins on US 191 southwest of Rock Springs.

Image gallery

References

External links
About Green River - Chamber of Commerce
Parks in the City of Green River - map
Pictures of Scott's Bottom/FMC Park

Parks in Wyoming
Protected areas of Sweetwater County, Wyoming